Donald Odell "Red" Barbary (June 20, 1920 – September 27, 2003) was an American Major League Baseball player who pinch hit in one game for the Washington Senators om May 22, . He went 0–1 in his only career at bat.

External links

1920 births
2003 deaths
Washington Senators (1901–1960) players
Baseball players from South Carolina
People from Simpsonville, South Carolina
Concord Weavers players